Conway Oscar Baker (September 9, 1911 – May 28, 1997) was an American football player who played professionally as a guard and tackle in the National Football League (NFL) for the Chicago Cardinals from 1936 to 1945. He was also a member of the combined Cardinals and Pittsburgh Steelers squad known in as Card-Pitt in 1944. Baker attended C. E. Byrd High School in Shreveport, Louisiana and played college football at Centenary College of Louisiana.

Baker later worked for City of Shreveport Traffic Engineering Department. He died May 28, 1997, in Shreveport, after suffering from Alzheimer's disease.

References

External links
 

1911 births
1997 deaths
American football guards
American football tackles
Card-Pitt players
Centenary Gentlemen football players
Chicago Cardinals players
People from Marlin, Texas
Players of American football from Shreveport, Louisiana
Neurological disease deaths in Louisiana
Deaths from Alzheimer's disease